Tumi Music is a UK independent record label well known for its Latin American (mainly Cuban), Peruvian music, and pan pipe music.

Famous for releasing the CD Lamento Negro (2001) that won the Latin Grammy Award for Best Folk Album for Susana Baca in 2002.

Artists 
 Afro Cuban All Stars
 Andy Gola
 Aragon (musician)
 Buena Vista Social Club
 Candido Fabre
 Celina Gonzalez
 Chucho Valdés
 Elio Revé
 Felix Baloy
 Jamelao
 Los Kjarkas
 Omara Portuondo
 Papa Noel (musician)
 Roberto Pla
 Son 14
 To’Mezclao
 Yusa

See also 
 List of record labels
 List of independent UK record labels

References

External links
 Official site

British record labels
Latin American music record labels
World music record labels
Record labels established in 1983